Dirty Thirty is a greatest hits album by Australian rock band The Screaming Jets, released on 10 May 2019. The album celebrates the 30th anniversary of the band's formation and includes tracks from the band's first seven studio albums.

The album will be supported by a national tour commencing in Newcastle on 3 May and concluding in Adelaide on 25 May.

Track listing
CD1

CD2

Release history

References

2019 greatest hits albums
The Screaming Jets albums
Sony Music Australia albums
Compilation albums by Australian artists